RoboRoach is a Canadian animated television series which ran on Teletoon in Canada, Animania HD in the United States, and Fox Kids internationally. The title song was sung by Big Rude Jake. It follows the story of a cockroach named Ruben and his brother Reginald. While scavenging for food, as seen in the opening, Ruben is caught and experimented on. His brother saves him, but when they jump into an electrical outlet, Ruben is transformed forever into a robot and cockroach cyborg called a roboroach. After that, he swears to use his powers only for the good of everyone and never for personal use, which is unfortunate for Reginald.

Characters

Main
 Ruben "Rube" Roach (Scott Thompson) is the second-born and younger of the Roach brothers' has been turned into a "super-bug" thanks to being captured and experimented on before he hopped into an electrical outlet and transformed into RoboRoach, and since that day he serves as the superhero of the fictional town of Vexberg. He always thinks of the others before himself and never accepts gifts of gratitude, and that's the reason why he and his brother live in poverty. Ruben is also quite childish, naïve and believes almost everything anyone tells him. He has three pet lice and a "larvy" doll that he can't sleep without. His robotic superpowers include transforming into almost anything, from washing machines to scooters and from planes to toilets.
 Reginald "Reg" Roach (Ted Dykstra) is the firstborn and eldest of the Roach brothers' who always tries to get rich but always fails. He is overambitious and cares only about himself. Reginald tries to use his brother's powers to obtain money but Ruben always turns down reward offers because, as he says: "A good deed is its own reward!". That infuriates Reginald and he is also quite selfish and bad-tempered/ill-tempered. This often causes him a lot of trouble. However he is still Ruben's big brother regardless and there are times he can cast out his own greed and anger aside just for his big younger brother whenever he believes he might lose his brother and more, showing us he truly cares for his brother and loves him as much as Ruben does for him. His catchphrase is "Why me? Why me? Why all the time me?" with slight variations according to the episode. He could be described as an ever-failing character.
 Mayor Mierworm is the mayor of Vexburg. she does not like Ruben or Reginald and thinks of them as menaces. Once she even tried to blame them for a crime they never committed, just to get rid of them. As a politician she is not very good but seemingly Mayor Mierworm gets re-elected quite often.
 Skeeter Jettings is the main reporter in the series and can be found announcing the news on Reginald Ruben's TV. His name is a spoof on Peter Jennings.
 The Police Chief is Roboroach's friend and chief of the police station. Also known for his giggle.
 Doc is the Roach brothers' personal physician.
 Sterling Überbucks is CEO and owner of his company "Überbucks Dynamic Concerns". He and his helper Toadie are always trying to get richer at the cost of anything. Sterling has a nephew Stewie Jr., an evil twin brother named Carling and a great-great-great-grandfather named Sterling Überrucks The Very 1st.

Villains

 Mandible Lecter, a dangerous murderer, kidnaps innocent bugs and eats them.
 Widow Black, a black widow, who marries bugs.
 The Exterminator, a war-fanatic with a German accent is considered to be a mercenary.
 F. Lee Brain, a mad scientist that is bent on conquering the world with the help of his henchman Slug.
 The Disciplinarian/Ms.Conduct, a former teacher to Ruben and Reginald.

Episodes
The show Extermination! in the episode "Battling for Uberbucks / Death of a Salesbug" is a play of the reality show Survivor. The episode "Revenge of the Fleabrain" parodies Superman. The episode "Ghost Bunglers" is based on the Ghostbusters film series

The episode "The Fly Who Loved Me" is based on the 1977 film The Spy Who Loved Me

With Teletoon original airdates in parentheses:

Season 1 (2002)
 Reg Bugs Out / Little Big Mouth
 Pains, Drains, and Robomobiles / Jungle Bugs
 Fitness Bug / Runaway Roaches
 Popsicle Pest / Weakened Gladiators
 Sugar Mommy / X-Pet
 Bedridden Bug / Robo Roach: The Movie
 Two Bugs and a Baby / Überland
 Santa's Bitter Helper / Flushed-Aways
 Robo Watch / Sins of the Teacher
 Rube Awakenings / Battling For Uberbucks
 Bug Tusslers / Death of a Salesbug
 Revenge of the Fleabrain / Ghost Bunglers
 Mite Makes Wrong / Good Deed Day
 The Flying Roachinis / Cowbugs
 Political Partying / Bugfoot Tetish
 Bugs With Gas / Insectizoids
 Vexburg 500 / Guilty Please
 Family Feud / Robo Reg
 Under The Rainbow / Bed Bug Walking
 Sluggies / Delivery Bugs
 Jockey Shorts / The RoboRoach Show
 The Big Bug Sleep / Prehistoric Pest
 Ruby's Slippers / The President's Brain Is Missing
 Club Dead / Omega Mites
 The Great Reginini / Dustmites Come Home
 The High Cost Of Laughing / Loco Hero

Season 2 (2003–2004)
 Shuttle Bugs / Rememberizing Rube
 Ship Of Foods / Pipe Reams
 CopRoach Academy / Tooth For A Tooth
 Überpops / Ballwashers Championship
 Office Hours / Miss Vexburg
 The Dapper Dandies Of Dusty Gulch / Of Lice And A Men
 Spelunkheads / Giggling Island
 Reggie's Hero / Gourmet Rude
 Mystic Warbugs / X Hits The Spot
 The Miracle Of Girth / The Purse Of The Mummy
 A Pair Au Pairs / Shocking Tales
 Reality Bytes / Debonairhead
 Elves' Night Off / Loose Sleuths
 Death Takes A Half Day / Übertrain
 The Sacrificial Ham / Bug Brother Is Watching
 Space Cadets / Love Bugs
 WereRoach / Remote Control Roach
 No Pain No Weight Gain / El Regidente
 Sins Of The Teacher II / Robo Reunion
 Opposites Detract / Robo Nurse
 Night Of The Living Beds / Superhero Sampler
 Reggie's Eleven / Easter Charade
 It's A Mad Mad Mad Reg / Gold Fever
 Spitting Images / Youth Juice
 The Living Bro / The Fly Who Loved Me
 Road To Ubugme / Ticking Time Bug

Production
The series is based on true stories about Japanese scientists who implanted cameras and mini-computers in cockroaches and sent them into disaster zones to look for life signs.

A third 26-episode season of the show was planned as of early 2003 but was never produced. Disney Media Distribution own the show's international rights.

References

External links
 

2000s Canadian animated television series
2001 Canadian television series debuts
2004 Canadian television series endings
Canadian children's animated comedy television series
English-language television shows
Teletoon original programming
Animated television series about brothers
Animated television series about insects